Folkart Towers are 47-floor twin skyscrapers in the Bayraklı district of the Turkish city of İzmir.

The construction of the towers began in 2011 and in April 2013, they surpassed Hilton İzmir to become the tallest buildings in the city. The construction works were completed in 2014. During their construction, 1000 people were employed, and upon completion, they were expected to be the place of residence or work for 4000 people. In February 2015, the largest art gallery in Turkey was opened in the towers. The gallery has an area of 800 m2.

Images

See also
List of tallest buildings in Turkey

References 

Buildings and structures in İzmir
Residential skyscrapers in Turkey
Skyscraper office buildings in Turkey